John Scott (21 September 1823 – 30 August 1888) was an English entomologist. He was born, and died, in Morpeth. His collection of specimens is held at the Natural History Museum, London.

References

1823 births
1888 deaths
English entomologists
People from Morpeth, Northumberland